Marie-Élaine Thibert (born April 18, 1982) is a Canadian adult contemporary and pop singer based in Quebec. Thibert was first notable for being the runner-up in the first season of Star Académie in 2003, the Quebec singing idol reality show. She is also a two-time Felix-award winner for Best Female Artist in Quebec and one-time Juno-award winner for Best Francophone album in Canada.

Background

Early life
Born in the district of LaSalle in the Montréal region, Thibert started to express interest in music during high school and college. She participated in several competitions and contests some of which she won. Thibert then auditioned for Star Académie in 2003 in which she performed on several occasions one of her favorites songs performed originally by Jacques Brel. Thibert finished second to Acadien-born Wilfred Le Bouthillier in the show's first season.

After Star Académie, Thibert met up several times with her long-time Idol Celine Dion and once met a duet performance prior to her disc launch.

Music career
Her self-titled debut album was launched a few months after Star Académie in early 2004. 300,000 copies of the album were sold, which easily surpassed the totals of Le Bouthiller's self-titled album and season-two champion Stéphanie Lapointe's Sur le fil, the latter of which is in a genre similar to Thibert but with a much lighter tone. The success of the album resulted in two Felix award at the ADISQ gala later that year. She won the awards for the album with the best sales and best female singer. She won the latter category again in 2005. She also won a Juno Award for best Francophone Album in Canada for her debut album, ahead of Dany Bédard, Nicola Ciccone, Canadian Idol finalist Audrey De Montigny and Les Trois Accords. She was also nominated for Juno Fan Choice Award in which Avril Lavigne won ahead of Thibert, Sarah McLachlan, Diana Krall and Shania Twain.

In 2007, Thibert released her second album Comme ça and as of August 2007, over 100 000 copies were sold. The album was made with the help of collaborators such as Chris de Burgh, Luc de Larochellière, Michel Rivard and Paul Piché as well as musical contributions from Marc Dupré, Marc Déry and Daniel Lavoie.

In addition, Thibert has released a DVD from a live performance at Montreal's Bell Centre during her Quebec-wide tour in 2005–2006. The show aired on TV network TVA which was the main network of all three Star Académie seasons from 2003 to 2006. In 2007–2008, she made a second province-wide tour in which most shows were sold out very quickly. Her albums include Marie-Élaine Thibert (self-titled debut album released in 2004), Comme Ça (released: April 17, 2007) and Un Jour Noël (released: October 14, 2008).

In March 2019, she was one of 11 singers from Quebec, alongside Ginette Reno, Diane Dufresne, Céline Dion, Isabelle Boulay, Luce Dufault, Louise Forestier, Laurence Jalbert, Catherine Major, Ariane Moffatt and Marie Denise Pelletier, who participated in a supergroup recording of Renée Claude's 1971 single "Tu trouveras la paix" after Claude's diagnosis with Alzheimer's disease was announced.

In 2021, Thibert and Le Bouthillier performed together in the first season of Chanteurs masqués, the Quebec adaptation of The Masked Singer, as a pair of lovebirds. Although not a couple in real life, they have often collaborated since their shared season of Star Académie. They won the competition.

Discography

Studio albums

Filmography
 Marie-Elaine en spectacle (2006) - DVD

References

External links
 Website of Marie-Elaine Thibert
 Biography of Marie-Elaine Thibert courtesy of Quebec Info Musique 

Living people
Singers from Montreal
1982 births
Participants in Canadian reality television series
Juno Award for Francophone Album of the Year winners
People from LaSalle, Quebec
French-language singers of Canada
Canadian women pop singers
21st-century Canadian women singers
Masked Singer winners